Faith Church (Hit Gyülekezete) is an Evangelical charismatic Pentecostal Christian denomination and a megachurch in Hungary. The headquarters of Budapest has over 150,000 members.

History   
Faith Church was founded in 1979 by a group of seven Hungarians, led by Pastor , who currently leads the church.  The independent Pentecostal-Charismatic church could conduct its worship services only illegally during the years of the Communist regime.  Its activities and leaders were monitored by the Communist secret service. By 1989, membership reached 2,000 people.  In 1989, the Hungarian State declared Faith Church a recognized denomination based on the 1895 XLIII Act.

In 2008, Faith Church in Budapest had 30,000 faithful in its 5,000-seat building.

In 2016, the Church has 70,000 people regularly attend worship services across Hungary. The weekly Sunday service of the Church is regularly broadcast on live television.

There are about three hundred local church branches of Faith Church functioning all around the country and beyond the borders of Hungary. All neighboring countries, Germany and the U.S. have local Faith Churches as well. The majority of local churches hold worship services on privately owned property. Local churches in Pécs, Debrecen, Nyíregyháza and Salgótarján are also housed in buildings that can accommodate more than a thousand people.

Based on the 1% tax designation to churches, Faith Church is the fourth most supported church in Hungary. However, according to the last census in Hungary  Faith Church was not among the four biggest churches. It kept its official church status after the Orbán government's 2011 reduction of the number of churches.

Social programs and publications
The Faith and Morals Cultural Foundation performs social services, provides aid to families, cares for the elderly and also pursues teaching, training, information distribution and cultural services.

Faith Church maintains elementary schools in Budapest, Pécs, Nyíregyháza and Salgótarján and a kindergarten in Kecskemét. The state-accredited theological college, Saint Paul’s Academy, functions in Budapest.

The Church has published a weekly news magazine, Hetek, since 1997.

Beliefs 
The denomination has a charismatic confession of faith.

On the 16th of November, 2019, the head of the church, Sándor Németh, on a service described yoga as "a physical exercise of demon worship."

See also
List of the largest evangelical churches
List of the largest evangelical church auditoriums
Worship service (evangelicalism)

References

External links 
 
 
 CBN: Pastor Moves on Atheistic Hungary
 Charisma Magazine: Breakthrough in Budapest 
 Faith Church TV Presentation

Protestantism in Hungary
Evangelicalism in Hungary
Christian organizations established in 1979
Christian denominations established in the 20th century
Pentecostal denominations
Evangelical megachurches in Hungary